Holman was a stop on the Ilwaco Railway and Navigation Company's narrow gauge line that ran on the Long Beach Peninsula in Pacific County, Washington, USA from 1889 to 1930.  Development in the area began when James Duval Holman.  received a donation land claim on the west side of what is now Ilwaco.

See also
 Long Beach, Washington

References 

Geography of Pacific County, Washington
Former populated places in Washington (state)